Plague Soundscapes is the second studio album by The Locust, and their first with ANTI- Records. It features a more refined sound than previous The Locust albums, with a greater emphasis on keyboards.

Track listing

Personnel
Justin Pearson – bass guitar, vocals
Bobby Bray – guitar, vocals
Joey Karam – keyboards, vocals
Gabe Serbian – drums

References

External links
ANTI-Records Album Page (Cover Art, Liner Notes, Description, and Related Articles)

2003 albums
The Locust albums
Anti- (record label) albums
Albums produced by Alex Newport